Sphegina sibirica is a species of hoverfly.

Distribution
Austria, Belgium, Great Britain, Czech Republic, Estonia, Finland, France, Germany, Hungary, Italy, Latvia, Liechtenstein, Lithuania, Netherlands, Norway, Romania, Slovakia, Slovenia, Sweden, Switzerland & Yugoslavia.

References

Diptera of Europe
Eristalinae
Insects described in 1953